Ernesto Noya was an Argentine wrestler. He competed in the men's Greco-Roman heavyweight at the 1948 Summer Olympics.

References

External links
 

Year of birth missing
Possibly living people
Argentine male sport wrestlers
Olympic wrestlers of Argentina
Wrestlers at the 1948 Summer Olympics
Place of birth missing
20th-century Argentine people